Cremolobus is a genus of flowering plants belonging to the family Brassicaceae.

Its native range is Andes.

Species:

Cremolobus bolivianus 
Cremolobus chilensis 
Cremolobus peruvianus 
Cremolobus rhomboideus 
Cremolobus stenophyllus 
Cremolobus subscandens 
Cremolobus suffruticosus

References

Brassicaceae
Brassicaceae genera